Li Jiajun (born October 15, 1975 in Changchun, Jilin) is a former Chinese short track speed skater who has won 5 Olympic medals – two silver and three bronze. He has been a two-time Overall World Champion for 1999 and 2001.

Biography
In 1998 Winter Olympics, he led for much of the way during the final race of the 1000m, but was edged out at the finish-line by Korea's Kim Dong-Sung, to win a silver medal. He also won a bronze medal in 5000m relay.

He participated in the 2002 Winter Olympics at Salt Lake City, making the finals of the 1000 meter short course event but failed to win a medal after being disqualified following a collision with Apolo Ohno, which caused Ahn Hyun-Soo and Mathieu Turcotte to also fall and allowed Australian Steven Bradbury to claim the gold medal.

During the opening ceremony of the 2007 Asian Winter Games, Li was given the honour to light the torch. As of August 18, 2006, he officially retired from short track speedskating.  According to Li, he went to study in Canada later that year and continued his work as the assistant coach for the national team.

References

1975 births
Living people
Chinese male speed skaters
Chinese male short track speed skaters
Olympic bronze medalists for China
Olympic short track speed skaters of China
Olympic silver medalists for China
Olympic medalists in short track speed skating
Short track speed skaters at the 1994 Winter Olympics
Short track speed skaters at the 1998 Winter Olympics
Short track speed skaters at the 2002 Winter Olympics
Short track speed skaters at the 2006 Winter Olympics
Medalists at the 2006 Winter Olympics
Medalists at the 2002 Winter Olympics
Medalists at the 1998 Winter Olympics
Asian Games medalists in short track speed skating
Asian Games gold medalists for China
Asian Games silver medalists for China
Asian Games bronze medalists for China
Short track speed skaters at the 1996 Asian Winter Games
Short track speed skaters at the 1999 Asian Winter Games
Short track speed skaters at the 2003 Asian Winter Games
Medalists at the 1996 Asian Winter Games
Medalists at the 1999 Asian Winter Games
Medalists at the 2003 Asian Winter Games
Universiade medalists in short track speed skating
Speed skaters from Changchun
Universiade gold medalists for China
Competitors at the 1997 Winter Universiade